Fundamentalism refers to a variety of religious, political and ideological philosophies or movements.

Fundamentalism or Fundamentalist may also refer to:

Religious positions 
 Christian fundamentalism
 Hindu fundamentalism
 Islamic fundamentalism
 Jewish fundamentalism
 Mormon fundamentalism

Other uses
 Fundamentalism (sculpture), a sculpture by Jens Galschiot
 Fundamentalist (album), a 2007 album by Russell Morris
 Market fundamentalism